These are the official results of the Women's 400 metres hurdles event at the 1990 European Championships in Split, Yugoslavia, held at Stadion Poljud on 29 and 31 August 1990.

Medalists

Results

Final
31 August

Semi-finals
29 August

Semi-final 1

Semi-final 2

Heats
29 August

Heat 1

Heat 2

Heat 3

Heat 4

Participation
According to an unofficial count, 31 athletes from 18 countries participated in the event.

 (1)
 (1)
 (1)
 (2)
 (1)
 (1)
 (1)
 (1)
 (1)
 (2)
 (1)
 (3)
 (3)
 (3)
 (1)
 (3)
 (2)
 (3)

See also
 1988 Women's Olympic 400m Hurdles (Seoul)
 1991 Women's World Championships 400m Hurdles (Tokyo)
 1992 Women's Olympic 400m Hurdles (Barcelona)

References

 Results

Hurdles 400
400 metres hurdles at the European Athletics Championships
1990 in women's athletics